Jean de Bourbon, Count of Soissons and Enghien (6 July 1528 or 1526 – 10 or 15 August 1557) was a French prince du sang from the House of Bourbon-Vendome, a cadet branch of the House of Bourbon (itself a cadet branch of the Capetian dynasty).

Biography

John (Jean) de Bourbon was born at La Fere as the fourth son of Charles, Duke of Vendome and his wife Francoise d'Alencon. He became Count of Enghien after the accidental death of his elder brother Francis in 1546. On 14 June 1557, he married Mary of Bourbon, the daughter of Francis, Duke of Estouteville. His marriage with Mary produced no children.

Military career
During King Henry II's intervention in the War of Parma in 1551, John was sent, along with his brother Louis, to Piedmont with reinforcements to strengthen the French army. Later during the Italian War of 1551–1559, he was killed at the Battle of Saint-Quentin in 1557; his heart was buried at Gaillon afterwards.

References

Sources

French military leaders
Military leaders of the Italian Wars
House of Bourbon-La Marche
Counts of France
16th-century peers of France
1528 births
1557 deaths
People from La Fère